Elverson Road is a Docklands Light Railway (DLR) station in the St John's area of Lewisham in south east London, and situated in a residential neighbourhood. Opening in 1999 as part of the Lewisham extension, Elverson road station is one of the newer stations of the DLR network situated between Lewisham and Deptford Bridge.

The service pattern is as follows:

15 tph to Lewisham, calling at Lewisham only from platform 1.
15 tph to Bank, calling at Deptford Bridge, Greenwich, Cutty Sark, Island Gardens, Mudchute, Crossharbour, South Quay, Canary Wharf and West India Quay. Some trains at peak hours branch off here for Stratford. Trains then run to Westferry, Limehouse and Shadwell where some peak trains will head for Tower Gateway, and the rest will call at Bank. These services depart from platform 2.

Upon opening, the station was one of the most lightly used on the DLR network, but traffic has increased significantly following the construction of several new apartment complexes in the area.

The station is located between Deptford Bridge and Lewisham stations, and is on the boundary of Travelcard Zone 2 and Zone 3.

The station site straddles the boundary between the boroughs of Lewisham and Greenwich, and passengers must briefly cross into Greenwich when walking over the footbridge to reach the opposite platform.

Selective Door Operation is in use at this station as it cannot accommodate 3-car trains. Passengers wishing to alight at Elverson road must move towards the centre of the train (like Cutty Sark DLR) to alight.

References

Docklands Light Railway stations in the London Borough of Lewisham
Railway stations in Great Britain opened in 1999